The order of battle for the Battle of Ayacucho proceeded as follows:

See also
Battle of Ayacucho

Notes

Spanish American wars of independence orders of battle